Michael Poynton (born 15 May 1961) is  a former Australian rules footballer who played with Fitzroy in the Victorian Football League (VFL) and North Adelaide in the South Australian National Football League (SANFL).

Notes

External links 
		
		
Michael Poynton (North Adelaide Football Club)
		
		
		

Living people
1961 births
Australian rules footballers from Victoria (Australia)
Fitzroy Football Club players